Mary Kelly may refer to:

Mary Jane Kelly (1863–1888), widely believed to be the fifth and final victim of Jack the Ripper
Mary Kelly (writer) (1927–2017), Scottish writer
Mary Kelly (camogie) (born 1992), Irish camogie player in All-Ireland Senior Club Camogie Championship 2005
Mary Kelly (artist) (born 1941), American artist and writer
Mary Kelly (gymnast) (1907–1986), British Olympic gymnast
Mary Kelly (handballer) (born 1985), Australian handball player
Mary Kelly (journalist), (1926-2005?), American journalist
Mary Kelly (politician) (born 1952), Irish Labour Party politician, Member of the 20th Seanad 
Mary Beth Kelly, justice on the Michigan Supreme Court
Mary Eva Kelly (1826–1910), Irish poet and writer
Mary Louise Kelly (born 1971), National Public Radio's senior Pentagon correspondent
Mary Kelly (playwright) (1888–1951), British playwright, pageant maker and founder of the Village Drama Society
Mary Jane Kelly (band), an Australian hardcore band